Beyer, Peacock and Company was an English railway locomotive manufacturer with a factory in Openshaw, Manchester. Founded by Charles Beyer, Richard Peacock and Henry Robertson, it traded from 1854 until 1966. The company exported locomotives, and machine tools to service them, throughout the world.

Founders
German-born Charles Beyer had undertaken engineering training related to cotton milling in Dresden before moving to England in 1831 aged 21. He secured employment as a draughtsman at Sharp, Roberts and Company's Atlas works in central Manchester, which manufactured cotton mill machinery and had just started building locomotives for the Liverpool and Manchester Railway. There he was mentored by head engineer and prolific inventor of cotton mill machinery, Richard Roberts. By the time he resigned 22 years later he was well established as the company's head engineer; he had been involved in producing more than 600 locomotives.

Richard Peacock had been chief engineer of the Manchester, Sheffield and Lincolnshire Railway's locomotive works in Gorton when he resigned in 1854, confident in his ability to secure orders to build locomotives. Beyer's resignation presented Peacock with a partnership opportunity. However, the business at the outset (Beyer, Peacock & Co.) was a legal partnership and the partners were therefore liable for debts should the business fail; in a mid-Victorian economic climate of boom and bust, it was a risky venture. Beyer could raise £9,524 (nearly £900,000 in 2015) and Peacock £5,500, but they still required a loan from Charles Geach (founder of the Midland Bank and first treasurer to the Institution of Mechanical Engineers), of which Beyer and Peacock had been founding members. Soon afterwards, however, Geach died, the loan was recalled, and the whole project nearly collapsed. Thomas Brassey came to the rescue, persuading Henry Robertson to provide a £4,000 loan in return for being the third (sleeping) partner. It was not until 1883 that the company was incorporated as a private limited company and renamed Beyer, Peacock & Co. Ltd. In 1902 it took on its final form as a public limited company.

During the Great Depression, faced with competition from tramways and electric railways, the company began to look for alternatives so that they were not dependent on one product. In 1932 they acquired their first company and in 1949 formed a joint company with Metropolitan-Vickers to build locomotives other than steam. By 1953 Beyer, Peacock had acquired more than five subsidiary companies; two others followed five years later. In 1958 Beyer, Peacock (Hymek) Ltd was formed.

Gorton Foundry

Beyer and Peacock started building their Gorton Foundry in 1854 two miles east from the centre of Manchester at Openshaw on a 12-acre site, on the opposite (south) side of the Manchester, Sheffield and Lincolnshire Railway (MS&LR) line from Peacock's previous works. The site was chosen because land was cheaper than in the city, allowing ample room to expand, and there was a good water supply from an MS&LR reservoir. At the Foundry, Beyer designed and manufactured machine tools needed to build the locomotives, and oversaw locomotive design and production. Peacock dealt with the business side, often travelling to continental Europe to secure orders.

In July 1855 the first locomotive, built for the Great Western Railway, left Gorton Foundry. Between 1854 and 1868 the company built 844 locomotives, of which 476 were exported. The company sold mainly to the British colonies, Southern Africa and South America.  The company had been commissioned by the London and North Western Railway to build a single copy of their Dreadnought Class for the Pennsylvania Railroad, as the former railway's shops were not legally permitted to sell their locomotives.  Aside from this locomotive, the company did not enter the North American market.

During the First World War Beyer, Peacock manufactured artillery; in August 1915 Gorton Works was put under government control with production switching almost entirely to the war effort, especially heavy field artillery. During the Second World War, the company was again brought under government control but continued to build locomotives throughout the war.

Condensing locomotives for underground railways

A technological innovation that strengthened the company's reputation was the world's first successful condensing  locomotive design for London's first underground railway – the Metropolitan Railway A Class 4-4-0 tank engine. Between 1864 and 1886, 148 were built for various railways; most operated until the lines' electrification in 1905. The locomotives' main designer, Hermann Ludwig Lange (1837–92), was a native of Beyer's home town, Plauen, Saxony (now Germany) who had undertaken an apprenticeship followed by engineering training. Beyer had invited him to England in 1861 and employed him for the first year in the company workshops, then as a draughtsman under his direction. He became chief draughtsman in 1864 or 1865. After Beyer's death in 1876, he became chief engineer and co-manager of the company.

Beyer-Garratt articulated locomotives

An articulated locomotive design that became renowned in the 20th century was another innovation, the Beyer-Garratt articulated locomotive (generically known as a "Garratt"), invented by Herbert William Garratt, who was granted a patent in 1908; Beyer, Peacock had sole rights of manufacture in Britain. After the patents ran out in 1928, the company began to use the name "Beyer-Garratt" to distinguish their locomotives. They became widely used throughout Africa, South America, Asia, Australia and the South Pacific, where difficult terrain and lightly laid, tightly curved track, usually narrow-gauge, severely limited the weight and power output of conventional locomotives. In Garratt's design, two girders holding a boiler and a cab were slung between two "engine" units, each with cylinders, wheels and motion. The weight of the locomotive was therefore spread over a considerable distance. Both engine units were topped by water tanks. The unit adjoining the cab end also held a fuel bunker.

Between 1909 and 1958, Beyer, Peacock built more than a thousand Garratts; significant types are listed below. Among them, three of the most significant are preserved (see the "Preserved steam locomotives" table below):

 first: the Tasmanian Government Railways K class, built in 1909 for the North East Dundas Tramway of western Tasmania
 most powerful: the East African Railways 59 class of 1955
 last: the South African Railways NG G16 class locomotive of 1958.

Diesel and electric locomotives
In the decade following 1954, the company built four types of diesel-powered locomotives and two electric types, listed below.

Decline and closure
The late 1950s saw a rapid transformation in locomotive manufacture. In 1955 British Railways decided to switch from steam to diesel traction and by then overseas railways had done the same. A major problem the company soon faced was that it had chosen to make diesel-hydraulic locomotives when the Western Region had opted for lightweight locomotives with hydraulic transmission under the British Railways Modernisation Plan of 1955; but British Railways opted for diesel-electrics. The company all but closed down the Gorton Foundry at the end of 1958.

In 1966, after 112 years of operation, all production ceased at Gorton Foundry. During that time, the company had built nearly 8,000 locomotives.

As of 2012 the building that housed the former boiler shop, tender shop and bolier mounting shop – 550 feet (167 metres) in length – remained in use as part of the Hammerstone Road Depot of Manchester City Council.

Gallery
(click to enlarge)

Classes of locomotives

Steam

Non-articulated
List shows delivery year(s), railway and locomotive class, wheel arrangement (Whyte notation) and number in order.

 1859 Victorian Railways J class (1859) , later 
 1859 Victorian Railways P class 
 1861 Victorian Railways B class  (19)
 1861 Victorian Railways O class  (11)
 1864–1885 Metropolitan Railway A class 
 1867–1868, 1872 Great Southern and Western Railway Class 101  (12)
 1869 South Australian Railways G class  (5)
 1869 Holdfast Bay Railway Company  (later, became South Australian Railways G class) (3)
 1871–1886 District Railway 
 1873–1926 Various locomotives for the Isle of Man Railway 
 1880–1881 Midland Great Western Railway Class D  (6)
 1874 Victorian Railways F class  (pattern engine)
 1874 Victorian Railways T class  (pattern engine)
 1875 South Australian Railways J class  (2)
 1876 South Australian Railways U class  (8)
 1876 South Australian Railways V class  (4)
 1877–1882 South Australian Railways W class  (35)
 1878 NSWGR Z12 class|New South Wales Government Railways Z12 class 
 1879 South Australian Railways L class  (4)
 1879–1884 South Australian Railways K class  (18)
 1879 Victorian Railways M class  (pattern engine)
 1879 Victorian Railways 'Old' R class  (pattern engine + 3)
 1880 Holdfast Bay Railway Company (later, became South Australian Railways Gd class)  (2)
 1882, 1895, 1899 Sligo, Leitrim and Northern Counties Railway Leitrim Class  (5)
 1884 South Australian Railways P class  (6)
 1884 Victorian Railways 'Old' A class 
 1885–1898 South Australian Railways Y class 
 1885–1907 Tasmanian Government Railways C class  (27)
 1888–1907 Silverton Tramway Y class ; two  (50)
 1889 Western Australian Government Railways G class  (7)
 1897–1898 Belfast and Northern Counties Railway Class B  (5)
 1897 Glenelg Railway Company  (later, became South Australian Railways Ge class) (2)
 1898 Tobu Railway B1 class  (12 locos)
 1902 Victorian Railways DD class  (20)
 1904 Great Northern Railway (Ireland) Q Class  (2)
 1905 Dublin, Wicklow and Wexford Railway nos 65 & 66  (2)
 1905 Dublin, Wicklow and Wexford Railway nos 67 & 68  (2)
 1906–1920 Cork, Bandon and South Coast Railway Bandon Tank  (8)
 1908, 1911 Great Northern Railway (Ireland) Class RT  (4)
 1912, 1915 Silverton Tramway A class  (4)
 1913, 1915 Great Northern Railway (Ireland) Class S & S2  (8)
 1913, 1915 Great Northern Railway (Ireland) Class SG & SG2  (10)
 1913 Great Northern Railway (Ireland) Class T  (5)
 1915, 1947 Great Northern Railway (Ireland) Class U  (10)
 1921, 1929–1930 Great Northern Railway (Ireland) Class T2  (10)
 1921 Rhymney Railway R class  (6)
 1922 Dublin and South Eastern Railway nos 15 & 16  (2)
 1924 Dublin and South Eastern Railway nos 34 & 35  (2)
 1928 Great Eastern Railway class S69 (later, became London and North Eastern Railway class B12) 
 1931 Great Western Railway 5700 class  (25)
 1932 Great Northern Railway (Ireland) Class V  (5)
 1948 Great Northern Railway (Ireland) Class VS  (5)
 1949 Sligo, Leitrim and Northern Counties Railway Lough Class  (2)
 1951–1952 Silverton Tramway W class  (4)
 1951–1952 Western Australian Government Railways W class  (60)
 1955 Western Australian Government Railways V class  (sub-contracted to Robert Stephenson and Hawthorns) (24)

Beyer-Garratt (articulated)
List shows delivery year(s), railway and locomotive class, wheel arrangement (Whyte notation) and number in order.

 1909 Tasmanian Government Railways K class
 1910 Darjeeling Himalayan Railway D class
 1911 Western Australian Government Railways M class  (6)
 1913 Western Australian Government Railways Ms class  (7)
 1925 London and North Eastern Railway class U1
 1926 Victorian Railways G class
 1927 London, Midland and Scottish Railway Garratt
 1928 New Zealand Railways G class
 1928 South African Railways GL class
 1936–1939 Fyansford Cement Works Railway (nos 1&2)
 1939 South African class NG G16
 1940–1952 Rhodesia Railways 15th class
 1949 East African Railways 56 class
 1951 Queensland Railways Beyer-Garratt class
 1951 South Australian Railways 400 class  (10)
 1952–1954, 1957 New South Wales Government Railways AD60 class  (42)
 1954-68 Rhodesia Railways 20th class
 1955 East African Railways 59 class
 1956 South African Railways GMA/M Class

Steam turbine
 1935 Beyer-Ljungström steam turbine locomotive, under licence, for the LMS

Diesel
 1954–56 Western Australian Government Railways X class
 1961–63 British Rail Class 35
 1962 British Rail Class 25
 1964 British Rail Class 17 (as sub-contractor to Clayton Equipment Company)

Electric
 1956–58 New South Wales 46 class
 1960–62 British Rail Class 82

Preserved locomotives
Click "Show" to display.

Notes

References

Select bibliography

External links

 Brief company biography
 Beyer Peacock history
 Finnish Railway Museum
 Steam Locomotives in Finland Including the Finnish Railway Museum
 London Transport Museum Website 
 

Locomotive manufacturers of the United Kingdom
History of Manchester
Defunct companies based in Manchester
Engineering companies of the United Kingdom
1854 establishments in England
1966 disestablishments in England
Beyer, Peacock locomotives
British companies established in 1854
British companies disestablished in 1966